"Sorry Not Sorry" is a song by American singer Demi Lovato. She co-wrote the song with Sean Douglas, Trevor Brown, William Zaire Simmons and its producer Oak Felder. It was released on July 11, 2017, through Island Records, Republic Records, Hollywood Records, and Safehouse Records, as the lead single from her sixth studio album, Tell Me You Love Me. An acoustic version of the song is included on the deluxe version of the album.

Commercially, "Sorry Not Sorry" reached number six in the US, number one in Wallonia and on the international chart of Malaysia, and the top ten in ten additional countries. Its music video was directed by Hannah Lux Davis and released on July 19, 2017. The song was certified platinum in Italy, New Zealand, and the United Kingdom, double platinum in Australia, triple platinum in Canada, quintuple platinum in the United States, and diamond in Brazil.

To promote the song, Lovato sang it at house parties after its release. She also promoted the song on several TV programs such as Good Morning America, The Tonight Show Starring Jimmy Fallon, and The Ellen DeGeneres Show, also at the 2017 MTV Video Music Awards and 2017 American Music Awards. It received a nomination for 2017 MTV Video Music Awards in the "Song of Summer" category  and again at the 2018 MTV Video Music Awards in the "Best Pop" category.

Production
"Sorry Not Sorry" was written by Warren "Oak" Felder, Sean Douglas, Trevor Brown, William Zaire Simmons and Demi Lovato for the latter's sixth studio album, Tell Me You Love Me. The production was handled by Oak with co-production by "Downtown" Trevor Brown and Zaire Koalo. The track was recorded with guidance by Jose Balaguer and Oak in Westlake Recording Studios and SuCasa Recording, respectively, both located in Los Angeles. The engineering of "Sorry Not Sorry" was done by Jose Balaguer, Oak and Chris Galland, added by Nicole "Coco" Llorens and assisted by Keith "Daquan" Sorrells. Manny Marroquin finished the mixing, assisted by Robin Florent and Scott Desmarais. The mastering was done by Chris Gehringer and Will Quinnell at Sterling Sound Studios. All four co-writers provided background vocals. Oak Felder performed the keyboards and also did the arrangement. Felder and Brown programmed the synthesizer, while Koalo programmed the drums.

Felder revealed to Songwriter Universe that the concept of the track was inspired by a phone conversation with his wife which Lovato "connected" to. "It connected specifically for her, because there's a lot of things in her past that people are looking for her to be apologetic for," he added.

Stefan Johnson of production team The Monsters and the Strangerz revealed to Variety that Lovato was conflicted between a track called "The Middle" and "Sorry Not Sorry" as the lead single, in May. Lovato opted the latter, as she called the former "too pop" and Lovato was trying to go "more soulful". The track was eventually recorded by Russian-German record producer Zedd with American electronic music duo Grey with American country music singer Maren Morris.

Lovato told Noisey that she had always wanted "Sorry Not Sorry" to be the lead single of Tell Me You Love Me but her inner circle felt the title track was a better choice "because it's emotional—it's vulnerable". Lovato then played both songs to the founder of Roc Nation, which her management Philymack was partnered with, Jay-Z. "And he said 'Sorry Not Sorry' because it was lighthearted. He was like, 'A lot of people see you do the emotional thing all the time, but they don't see you have fun!' And I was like, 'That's such a good point.' And [his opinion] kind of persuaded other people, too."

Release
On June 29, 2017, Lovato published a trio of pictures on her Instagram and Twitter accounts showing an acronym titled "SNS" causing speculation related to a possible new single. Five days after, the singer confirmed the release of a song via an Instagram video, and teased the instrumental of the track. The following day, Lovato posted a video on her Twitter revealing the title "Sorry Not Sorry". Lovato explained to Amazon Music that "Sorry Not Sorry" is a song for the "haters" with the message "You know what? I'm good now, and sorry I'm not sorry that you may not be loving where your life is at the moment."

Composition
"Sorry Not Sorry" is written in the key of B minor with a tempo of 144 beats per minute in common time. Lovato's vocal range on the song spans from the low note of A3 to the high note of A5. It runs for three minutes and twenty-three seconds.

Critical reception
Forbes contributor Hugh McIntyre described "Sorry Not Sorry" as "an unapologetic, braggadocious look in the mirror, with Lovato taking the opportunity to praise herself, and rightfully so," and further opined that "Lovato really packs a punch with her powerful vocals, which have been setting her apart from other female pop stars for years now." Elias Leight of Rolling Stone described the song as a "gleeful revenge on a callous ex" with "heavy rhythmic effects." Christopher Rosa of Glamour felt the song "takes self-empowerment to new heights." Lars Brandle of Billboard wrote it was "bound to be embraced as a girl-power anthem." On a less positive note, Mike Wass from Idolator stated that its theme was something that had "been done several dozen times before," as the concept is a "fairly tired tale of turning the tables on an ex/hater," and felt the chorus "offers more of the same."

Recognition
"Sorry Not Sorry" was included on several year-end lists. The website Thrillist ranked the song at number eight. Stereogum's Chris DeVille considered it the 18th pop song of the year, writing that "even the firmest gospel-pop foundation will not stop Demi Lovato from blowing your house down every time." Elle Magazines Nerisha Penrose included the track on her list at number 9 and described it as "an infectious, hater-shunning summer anthem will surely shut down all the naysayers." PopMatters ranked the song at number forty one.

Music video
The official music video was directed by Hannah Lux Davis and released via Vevo on July 19, 2017. The video sees Lovato throwing a house party, frolicking by a pool, in an inflatable tub, on an outdoor dance floor, and in a beach chair, as her friends thrash, laugh, and kiss around her. Paris Hilton, Wiz Khalifa and Jamie Foxx have cameo appearances in the video.

Live performances
Lovato first performed the single the night before its release at a fan listening party held in Los Angeles. She subsequently performed the song at other house parties. On August 18, 2017, Lovato made the first televised performance of the track on Good Morning America. On August 27, 2017, Lovato performed the song in Las Vegas as a pre-recorded performance for the 2017 MTV Video Music Awards. On September 18, 2017, Lovato performed the song on The Tonight Show Starring Jimmy Fallon. On September 30, 2017, Lovato performed the song on The Jonathan Ross Show. On October 4, 2017, Lovato performed the song on The Ellen DeGeneres Show On October 5, 2017, the singer performed the song on The Today Show, where she also performed "Tell Me You Love Me". On November 12, 2017, Lovato performed a medley of "Sorry Not Sorry" and "Tell Me You Love Me" at the 2017 MTV Europe Music Awards. On November 13, 2017, Lovato performed the song on Live Lounge, where she also performed "Skyscraper" and a cover of Sam Smith's "Too Good at Goodbyes". On November 19, 2017, Lovato performed the song at the 2017 American Music Awards. The track serves as the encore to her sixth headlining concert tour Tell Me You Love Me World Tour.

Covers and other versions
The Freedo Remix was used on the South Korean girl group competition show "Produce 48" for their dance position evaluations. The performance features Ahn Yujin, Kwon Eunbi, Choi Yena, Lee Chaeyeon, and Ko Yujin.

The song was also used on the eleventh season of RuPaul's Drag Race where contestants Brooke Lynn Hytes and Yvie Oddly had to lip-sync to it in order to avoid elimination. Subsequently, neither drag queen was eliminated.

Grammy Award-winning singer Michelle Williams performed the song on the second US series of The Masked Singer.

Chart performance
"Sorry Not Sorry" debuted on the US Billboard Hot 100 chart at number 52 three days following its release, selling 45,000 copies in the country. The single peaked at number six on the chart, becoming Lovato's first top-ten entry since "Heart Attack" in 2013, and her highest-charting single in the US. As of August 2021, "Sorry Not Sorry" is Lovato's most-streamed song in the United States amassing 1.040 billion streams. The song also reached number one on the Mainstream Top 40 chart, becoming Lovato's second number-one on the chart. "Sorry Not Sorry" also managed to reach the top 10 in the charts of other major music markets, such as Australia, New Zealand, Ireland and United Kingdom, where it became Lovato's sixth top 10 single.

Track listingsDigital download"Sorry Not Sorry" – 3:23Digital download – Freedo Remix"Sorry Not Sorry" (Freedo Remix) – 3:44Digital download – Acoustic Version'
 "Sorry Not Sorry" (acoustic version) – 3:25

Credits and personnel
Recording and management
Recorded at Westlake Recording Studios and SuCasa Recording Studios (Los Angeles, California)
Mixed at Larrabee Studios (North Hollywood, California)
Mastered at Sterling Sound Studios (New York City)
Published by DDLovato Music/Universal Music Corp. (ASCAP), Sony/ATV (BMI), Sony/ATV (BMI), Trevor Brown Publishing Designee (ASCAP), Quest Da Stars (ASCAP)

Personnel
Demi Lovato – lead vocals, composition
Oak Felder – composition, background vocals, production, additional record engineering, keyboard arrangement, synthesizer programming
"Downtown" Trevor Brown – composition, background vocals, co-production, synthesizer programming
Zaire Koalo – composition, background vocals, co-production, drum programming
Sean Douglas – composition, background vocals
Jose Balaguer – recording
Nicole "Coco" Llorens – additional engineering
Keith "Daquan" Sorrells – engineering assistance
Manny Marroquin – mixing
Chris Galland – mix engineering
Robin Florent – mix assistance
Scott Desmarais – mix assistance
Chris Gehringer – mastering
Will Quinnell – mastering

Credits adapted from the liner notes of Tell Me You Love Me.

Charts

Weekly charts

Year-end charts

Certifications

Release history

References

2017 singles
2017 songs
Demi Lovato songs
Songs written by Demi Lovato
Music videos directed by Hannah Lux Davis
Songs written by Oak Felder
Songs written by Sean Douglas (songwriter)
Hollywood Records singles
Island Records singles
Safehouse Records singles
Songs written by William Zaire Simmons
Song recordings produced by Oak Felder